Cild, literally meaning "child", is an Old English title borne by some Anglo-Saxon nobles and typically denotes a man of high rank.  As a cognomen, it may refer to:

Ælfric Cild (fl. AD 975-985), ealdorman of Mercia
Eadric Cild, also known as Eadric the Wild, (fl. 1068-70), Anglo-Saxon magnate who led English resistance to the Norman Conquest
Wulfnoth Cild (died c. 1014), South Saxon thegn and probable grandfather of King Harold Godwinson

See also
Child (disambiguation)
Eadwulf Yvelcild, also known as Eadwulf Evil-child, (fl. 973), Earl of Bamburgh